Chandragutti Renukamba Temple is a Hindu temple dedicated to goddess Renuka, It is located  away from its nearest city Sirsi and  from its district headquarters Shivamogga in Karnataka State of India.

Legend
King of Chandragutti  performed a yajna — a ritual performed to maintain peace and good health, he was blessed with a daughter (Renuka), who originated from the fire of this yajna, later she was married to sage Jamadagni, she was a devoted wife who used to carry water in the pots created of sand, she never dropped even a single drop of water as she used snakes as pads for the pot, but one day sage Jamadagni in is anger asked his son Parashurama to kill Renukamba because of her mistake on that day, Parashurama took his mother to the cave and cut her head, he then left her torso in the cave and took her head to his father, sage Jamadagni then offered a boon to his son and Parasurama in turn asked for his mother’s life, than Renukamba got her life back, this divine incident is believed to have taken place at Chandragutti.

See also
 Renuka
 Jamadagni
 Parashurama
 Sirsi Marikamba Temple
 Yellamma Temple, Saundatti

References

Hindu temples in Shimoga district
Devi temples in Karnataka
Renuka
Tourism in Karnataka